Mitchellville is a city in Desha County, Arkansas, United States. The population was 360 at the 2010 census.

Geography

Demographics

As of the census of 2000, there were 497 people, 180 households, and 129 families residing in the city. The racial makeup of the city was 0.40% White, 98.19% Black or African American, 0.20% Asian, 1.01% from other races, and 0.20% from two or more races.  1.21% of the population were Hispanic or Latino of any race.

There were 180 households, out of which 38.9% had children under the age of 18 living with them, 30.6% were married couples living together, 35.0% had a female householder with no husband present, and 28.3% were non-families. 26.1% of all households were made up of individuals, and 12.8% had someone living alone who was 65 years of age or older.  The average household size was 2.76 and the average family size was 3.33.

In the city, the population was spread out, with 38.0% under the age of 18, 9.3% from 18 to 24, 18.7% from 25 to 44, 20.9% from 45 to 64, and 13.1% who were 65 years of age or older.  The median age was 29 years. For every 100 females, there were 75.6 males.  For every 100 females age 18 and over, there were 64.7 males.

The median income for a household in the city was $17,625, and the median income for a family was $19,500. Males had a median income of $20,000 versus $16,042 for females. The per capita income for the city was $8,680.  About 39.2% of families and 43.7% of the population were below the poverty line, including 56.9% of those under age 18 and 53.8% of those age 65 or over.

Education
The Dumas School District serves Mitchellville.

References

Cities in Arkansas
Cities in Desha County, Arkansas